The Dajidae are a family of marine isopod crustaceans in the suborder Cymothoida. The original description was made by Giard and Bonnier in 1887. Members of this family are ectoparasites of krill. They resemble a fleshy growth on the krill's back, and make the host look as if it is wearing a rucksack. These genera are included in the family Dajidae:

Allophryxus Koehler, 1911
Antephyra Schultz, 1978
Arthrophryxus Richardson, 1908
Aspidophryxus G. O. Sars, 1883
Branchiophryxus Caullery, 1897
Colophryxus Richardson, 1908
Dajus Krøyer, 1846
Dolichophryxus Schultz, 1977
Heterophryxus G. O. Sars, 1885
Holophryxus Richardson, 1905
Notophryxus G. O. Sars, 1883
Oculophryxus Shields & Gómez-Gutiérrez, 1996
Paradajus Nierstrasz & Brender à Brandis, 1923
Paraspidophryxus Schultz, 1977
Prodajus Bonnier, 1903
Prophryxus Richardson, 1909
Streptodajus Nierstrasz & Brender à Brandis, 1923
Zonophryxus Richardson, 1903

References

Cymothoida
Crustacean families